Aybastı is a town and district of Ordu Province in the Black Sea region of Turkey. According to the 2000 census, population of the district is 31,071 of which 14,326 live in the town of Aybastı.

Etymology
The town was formerly known as Ibasdi (variants include Ibasda and Ibassa, Ίβασσα in ancient Greek) and mutated to Aybastı in the 20th century.

Geography
Aybastı is a rural, agricultural district in the foothills of the Canik Mountains above the Black Sea coast, 54 km inland from the coastal town of Fatsa. The climate and flora are typical of the central Black Sea region although the district is drier at high altitudes. The road up here from the coast is slow and winding, the journey takes over an hour, and journey from here up into the mountains is even worse, some of it on dirt roads. The people of these country villages are very traditional, for example they marry between the ages of 15 and 22 by arrangement between the families.

Aybastı itself is a small town providing high schools, a hospital and other basic amenities to the surrounding area. Market day is Saturday. The town is growing and today most buildings are four stories or more, the local economy is boosted by money coming from families that since the 1960s have been living and working in Istanbul, Ankara or abroad (especially France and Austria).

Places of interest

 Perşembe Plateau is a high meadow, one of the biggest tourist attractions in the area, located 17 km from the town of Aybastı. Under snow in winter but popular with walkers and trekkers in summer, when there are folklore festivals and country fairs in the 3rd week of July.

Perşembe Plateau has one of the best example of meander in Turkey even its picture is already taken place at geography textbooks.

Notes

References

External links
  District governor's official website
  Aybastı municipality
 photographs
  local info website (follow "resimler" for more photos)
  and another one
 Road map of Aybastı and environs
 Various images of Aybastı, Ordu
 Epasa - Έπασα - Aybasti

Populated places in Ordu Province
Districts of Ordu Province